Stephen Squeri (born 1959) is the CEO of American Express.

He has been in the position since February 1, 2018. He has been a vice chairman of American Express since 2015 and was group president of Amex's global corporate services group before that.

Career
Squeri graduated from Manhattan College with a bachelor of science in 1981 and an MBA in 1986. Beginning in 1981, Squeri spent four years as a management consultant at Arthur Andersen. As of 2017, Squeri also sits on the boards of J.Crew and The Guardian Life Insurance Company of America. He is a member of the board of trustees for the Valerie Fund and Manhattan College. Squeri also serves as a member of the board of governors for Monsignor McClancy Memorial High School in Queens., which he attended

Squeri joined American Express in 1985 as a manager in the Travellers Cheque Group. From 2000 to 2002, he served as President of the Establishment Services group in the U.S. and Canada, and he was President of the Corporate Card group from 2002 to 2005, during which time he globalized the business. He became the company’s Chief Information Officer in 2005 and also led the Corporate Development function, overseeing mergers and acquisitions. In 2009, he was named Group President and led the formation of the Global Services Group, consolidating and globalizing the company’s shared services functions. He was named Vice Chairman in 2015. In 2018, Squeri became Chairman and CEO of American Express after the retirement of Kenneth Chenault.

References

Living people
Manhattan College alumni
American Express people
1959 births
American chief executives of Fortune 500 companies